Trade Bank may refer to:

 Amsterdam Trade Bank
 Joson Trade Bank
 Trade Bank of Iraq